Anthony "Tony" Ray Potts (born January 23, 1968) is an American Emmy-winning television personality, producer, writer and media executive. 
In front of the camera as a presenter, Potts hosted USA Hollywood entertainment show Access Hollywood for 12-seasons from April 1999 to February 2011, before launching his own ideation company in the content, startup and investment space.

Biography
Potts graduated from Humboldt State University with a B.A. in Journalism/Editorial Writing and a Minor in Radio/Television. In the 90s, Potts hosted Good Day New York on WNYW and then moved from New York City to Los Angeles in 1997 after signing a one-year talk show development deal with ABC/Buena Vista Television, but the subsequent pilot was not picked up. He then signed a development deal with Paramount Television before leaving to join NBC and a subsequent long 13-season run on Access Hollywood.

In addition, Potts co-founded the early stage VC Sierra Maya 360, "Bridging Hollywood, Tech, Sports and e-Sports". The fund was awarded the 2015 Alternative VC Newcomer of the Year in Tech and Media.

That was followed by helping create, build and spin-out a digital studio in Amsterdam for MTG, Modern Times Group. Streamlining the news division while co-creating 19-formats to present at MIPTV and other market areas.

Potts is currently the creator and host of "Pardon The Disruption" and co-founder of The Content Artists, based in Los Angeles and London.

During Potts' time in New York, he appeared in the film Ransom. In Los Angeles he was in the season two finale of CSI: Miami, playing a helicopter pilot. He played himself on several episodes of the FX series Dirt, which starred Courteney Cox.

Potts expert guest appearances include CNN, MSNBC, FOX, HLN, NBC, The Today Show, ABC, Good Morning America and, in Europe, the BBC and RTL.

Sports
On February 16, 2007, Potts won the NBA All-Star Celebrity Game Most Valuable Player award, as Potts scored 14 points and had 8 rebounds as the West defeated the East 40-21.

Personal life
On July 24, 2010, he married  Indian entrepreneur and television personality Shalini Vadhera.  Potts has two daughters.

References

External links

Tony Potts' bio at Access Hollywood Online

1968 births
Living people
American television reporters and correspondents
California State Polytechnic University, Humboldt alumni